Zaid crops are summer season crops. They grow for a short time period between kharif and rabi crops, mainly from March to June. These crops are mainly grown in the summer season during a period called the zaid crop season. They require warm dry weather as major growth period and longer day length for flowering. Some summer months and rainy season is required. These crops also mature early.

In between the rabi and the kharif seasons, there is a short season during the summer months known as the zaid season. Some of the crops produced during zaid season are watermelon, muskmelon, cucumber, vegetables and fodder crops. Sugarcane takes almost a year to grow.

Zaid crops
 Watermelon
 Muskmelon
 Cucumber
 Bitter gourd
 Fodder 
 Pumpkin
Guar (Cluster Beans)
strawberry
Arhar (Pigeon pea)
Masur (Lentil)
Sugarcane

See also
 Agriculture in India
Rabi crops
Kharif crops

References

Agriculture in India
Agriculture in Pakistan
Crops